Harding Township may refer to:

Harding Township, New Jersey
Harding Township School District
Harding Township, Ramsey County, North Dakota, in Ramsey County, North Dakota
Harding Township, Lucas County, Ohio

See also
Hardin Township (disambiguation)

Township name disambiguation pages